This list of steam-driven torpedo boats of the United States Navy includes all ships with the hull classification symbol TB, running from TB-1 of 1890 to TB-35 of 1901. It does not include the Patrol Torpedo (PT) boats of World War II.

Cushing class torpedo boat

Ericsson class torpedo boat

Foote class torpedo boats

Porter class torpedo boats

Rowan class torpedo boat

Dahlgren class torpedo boats

Farragut class torpedo boat

Davis class torpedo boats

Morris class torpedo boat

Talbot class torpedo boats

MacKenzie class torpedo boats

Stringham class torpedo boat

Goldsborough class torpedo boat

Bailey class torpedo boat

Somers class torpedo boat

Manley class torpedo boat

Bagley class torpedo boats

Blakely class torpedo boats

Re-classification in 1918 
On 1 August 1918 all 17 surviving torpedo boats were redesignated as Coast Torpedo Boats and given numbers in place of their original names and were subsequently sold for breaking up in 1919 and 1920.

See also
PT boat
United States Navy torpedo retrievers

References

 Blackford, Charles Minor. Torpedoboat Sailor. Annapolis: United States Naval Institute, 1968.
 Chesneau, Roger, Eugène M. Koleśnik, and N. J. M. Campbell. Conway's All the World's Fighting Ships 1860–1905. New York: Mayflower Books, 1979.
 Fock, Harald. Fast Fighting Boats, 1870–1945 Their Design, Construction, and Use. Annapolis, Md: Naval Institute Press, 1978.
 Gardiner, Robert, Randal Gray, and Przemysław Budzbon. Conway's All the World's Fighting Ships 1906–1921. London: Conway Maritime Press, 1985.
 Mooney, James L. Dictionary of American Naval Fighting Ships. Washington: Naval Historical Center, Dept. of the Navy, 1991.
 Moore, John Evelyn. Jane's Fighting Ships of World War I. New York: Military Press, 1990.

Torpedo boats
Torpedo boats list
USN